Antoine Camille Diot (born 17 January 1989) is a French professional basketball player for ASVEL of the LNB Pro A. Standing at , he plays the point guard position. He also represents the French national basketball team.

Professional career
Diot began playing basketball with the youth teams of the French club JL Bourg en Bresse. He then played with Centre Fédéral, in the French 3rd-tier level league, the NM1, from 2004 to 2007. He began his professional career in 2007, with the French 1st-tier level Pro A League club, Le Mans. He moved to the French club Paris-Levallois Basket in 2012.

On 1 July 2013 Diot signed a two-year deal with the French Pro A team Strasbourg IG, with an opt-out clause after the first year. He was voted the French League French Player's MVP in 2014. In June 2014, he opted to remain with the team for one more season. He was voted the French Leaders Cup MVP in 2015.

On 10 July 2015 he signed a two-year contract with the Spanish ACB team Valencia Basket. With Valencia, he won the Spanish League 2016–17 season championship. On 5 July 2017 he signed a two-year contract extension with Valencia.

National team career
Diot was a member of the French junior national teams. With France's junior national teams, he played at the following tournaments: the 2004 FIBA Europe Under-16 Championship, where he won a gold medal, the 2005 FIBA Europe Under-16 Championship, where he won a silver medal, and was named the tournament's MVP, the 2006 FIBA Europe Under-18 Championship, where he won a gold medal, the 2007 FIBA Under-19 World Championship, where he won a bronze medal, the 2007 FIBA Europe Under-18 Championship, the 2008 FIBA Europe Under-20 Championship, and the 2009 FIBA Europe Under-20 Championship, where he won a silver medal, and was named to the All-Tournament Team.

Diot then became a member of the senior men's French national basketball team. With France's senior national team, he has played at the following major tournaments: the EuroBasket 2009, the EuroBasket 2013, where he won a gold medal, the 2014 FIBA Basketball World Cup, where he won a silver medal, and the 2016 Summer Olympics.

French senior national team stats

References

External links
 Antoine Diot at acb.com 
 Antoine Diot at draftexpress.com
 Antoine Diot at eurobasket.com
 Antoine Diot at euroleague.net
 Antoine Diot at fiba.com (archive)
 Antoine Diot at fibaeurope.com
 Antoine Diot at lnb.fr 
 
 
 
 

1989 births
2014 FIBA Basketball World Cup players
ASVEL Basket players
Basketball players at the 2016 Summer Olympics
Centre Fédéral de Basket-ball players
FIBA EuroBasket-winning players
French expatriate basketball people in Spain
French men's basketball players
Le Mans Sarthe Basket players
Liga ACB players
Living people
Olympic basketball players of France
Metropolitans 92 players
Sportspeople from Bourg-en-Bresse
Point guards
Shooting guards
SIG Basket players
Valencia Basket players